The Imperial Fault Zone is a system of geological faults located in Imperial County in the Southern California region, and adjacent Baja California state in Mexico. It cuts across the border between the United States and Mexico.

Geology
The Imperial Fault Zone is a right lateral-moving strike-slip fault, representing the northernmost transform fault associated with the East Pacific Rise.  It is connected to the San Andreas Fault by the Brawley Seismic Zone. It terminates on its southern end at the Cerro Prieto spreading center.

The Imperial Fault Zone is thought to accommodate slip from both the San Andreas and the San Jacinto fault zones. However, studies covering the last few hundred years show that the slip rate is insufficient to account for the total slip from the San Andreas system. The surface trace is well-located based on mapped surface offsets from historic events.

Earthquake history
The Imperial Fault Zone has a history of earthquakes of moderate magnitude, including several doublet earthquakes.
1915 Imperial Valley earthquakes: Two magnitude 6.25 shocks occurred ~1 hour apart. Six people died and several were injured in the second quake at Mexicali, located just inside the Mexican border. Unstable banks of the New and Alamo Rivers caved in many places.
1940 El Centro earthquake 
1979 Imperial Valley earthquake
2010 Baja California earthquake

See also 
Cerro Prieto Fault
Gulf of California Rift Zone
Salton Trough

References

Further reading

External links 
 Southern California Earthquake Data Center website: Imperial Fault Zone.

Seismic faults of California
Seismic faults of Mexico
Strike-slip faults
Geology of Imperial County, California
Natural history of Baja California
Natural history of the Colorado Desert
El Centro metropolitan area
Imperial Valley
Salton Trough